Claremont Trio is a New York-based piano trio including Juilliard School alumnae Emily Bruskin (violin) and  Julia Bruskin (cello), and Yale School of Music alumna Sophiko Simsive (piano). The group was founded at Juilliard in 1999, and made its performance debut at the 92nd Street Y, on the Upper East Side in 2001 after winning the Young Concert Artists International Auditions that same year. In 2003, the trio also won the Kalichstein-Laredo-Robinson International Trio Award. They have performed at the Kennedy Center, Isabella Stewart Gardner Museum, Joe's Pub and the Mostly Mozart and Bard Music festivals.

Discography
 2004 Mendelssohn Trios Op. 49 & 66. Arabesque
 2006 Shostakovich & Arensky Trios. Tria
 2008 American Trios, trios by Zwilich, Kirchner, Bates, and Schoenfield. Tria 
 2009 Jonathan Cohler & Claremont Trio with Jonathan Cohler (clarinet), trios of Beethoven and Brahms, and sextet by Dohnanyi. Ongaku
 2010 Beethoven & Ravel. Tria
 2012 Beethoven Triple Concerto, Op. 56; Trio in E Major, Op. 1, No. 1. Bridge
 2017 Spheres: Music of Robert Paterson. American Modern Recordings

References

External links
 Official site
 Claremont Trio on AllMusic
 Hear the Claremont Trio in concert from WGBH Boston
 The group's tour blog
 An interview with the Claremonts
Performances by the Claremont Trio from the Isabella Stewart Gardner Museum

Chamber music groups
Contemporary classical music ensembles
Juilliard School alumni